Ali Asgari may refer to:
Ali-Reza Asgari, Iranian general
Ali Asgari, Iran, a village